Vladislav Vasilievich Chebotar (born 22 February 1997) is a Russian sprint canoeist. He participated at the 2018 ICF Canoe Sprint World Championships.

References

External links

1997 births
Russian male canoeists
Living people
ICF Canoe Sprint World Championships medalists in Canadian
People from Tiraspol
Canoeists at the 2020 Summer Olympics
Olympic canoeists of Russia